Hann Land District is a land district (cadastral division) of Western Australia, located within the Eastern Land Division of the state. It spans roughly 24°00'S - 25°40'S in latitude and 120°00'E - 121°40'E in longitude, east of the rabbit-proof fence. Part of the Canning Stock Route passes through the south-east of the district. It is named in honour of explorer Frank Hann.

The district was created on 30 January 1925 and was defined in the Government Gazette:

References

Land districts of Western Australia